Robert Dyas is a UK hardware retailer founded in London in 1872. It sells a range of housewares, small electrical appliances, gardening products, kitchenwares, DIY, and consumer electronics throughout 93 shops, mainly in Greater London and South East England, as well as online.

Since 2012 Robert Dyas has been owned by Theo Paphitis, the entrepreneur and long-time star of BBC's Dragons' Den.

History 

Robert Dyas emigrated to England from County Meath, Ireland, and with an inheritance of just £5 he opened his first shop in the capital in 1872. By the time of his death at the age of 66 he had established 18 shops. His sons took over after that, followed by his two grandsons who died in 1961 and 2002.

Robert Dyas has survived several catastrophes including the Great Depression and the Blitz in which the head office, warehouse and 18 shops were destroyed.

In 1997, Robert Dyas's head office and warehouse burnt down in Croydon; the head office is now in Wimbledon, London, after a time in Leatherhead, Surrey.

In March 2004, Robert Dyas was bought by Change Capital Partners, a private equity firm headed by former Marks & Spencer chairman Luc Vandevelde.

By spring 2009, the company had come close to collapse with rumoured debts of £30 million. Change Capital Partners had lost control of the company to Lloyds Banking Group and Allied Irish Banking Group who owned the debt. Following a management buy-out, backed by the Lloyds Banking Group on 8 April  steps were taken by September of that year to secure its viability through a debt-for-equity deal that gave its lenders a majority stake in the chain.

In 2010–2011, Robert Dyas introduced a new trading format, increased its online offering and expanded the use of web kiosks and browsers.

The company was put up for sale in November 2011 by the Lloyds Banking Group and Allied Irish Banking Group. Following a sale process led by Cavendish Corporate Finance, the company was successfully sold in July 2012 to Theo Paphitis.

Shops and products
Robert Dyas currently operates 93 standalone shops (down from 97 in April 2014). Shop count has also decreased at Ryman Limited, likewise owned by Theo Paphitis, with shops closed at lease expiry. This has led to a decreased turnover by 2.5%. Shops are mainly found in London and the south east of England, but also exist as far away as Bristol in the West and Solihull and Kenilworth in the West Midlands.

In 2013 a rolling program of introducing electronic displays into shops was started. Now 20 shops have both electronic screens in shops, showing infomercials, plus screens in front windows showing electronic posters. Shop teams in some locations also use portable tablets to help customer purchasing decisions and improve their overall shopping experience.

The product range is primarily focused on housewares, 'end of line' products as special offers and light DIY. Core departments include kitchenware, vacuums and kitchen appliances, steam cleaning, cleaning chemicals and laundry products, garden care, outdoor leisure, DIY tools and materials, home office and technology. The business has also expanded into seasonal gifting ranges at key times of the year.

Advertising 
In December 2015, the company gained attention for its Christmas advert, in which staff and customers announce their sexual orientation while demonstrating products.

References

External links
 Official website
 Times interview with Steven Round 20 April 2007
 BBC: Theo Paphitis Buys Robert Dyas 10 July 2012
  Retail Week report; "Robert Dyas profits surge under Theo Paphitis" 31 July 2013

Home improvement companies of the United Kingdom
Retail companies established in 1872